The 2015–16 Georgia Lady Bulldogs women's basketball team will represent University of Georgia in the 2015–16 college basketball season. The Lady Bulldogs, led by first year head coach Joni Taylor. The team plays their home games at Stegeman Coliseum, and are a member of the Southeastern Conference. They finished the season 21–10, 9–7 in SEC play to finish in sixth place. They lost in the second round of the SEC women's tournament to Tennessee. They received an at-large bid to the NCAA women's tournament where they lost in the first round to Indiana.

Roster

Schedule

|-
! colspan="12" style="background:#000; color:#a0000b;"| Non-conference regular season

|-
! colspan="12" style="background:#000; color:#a0000b;"| SEC regular season

|-
! colspan="12" style="background:#000; color:#a0000b;"| SEC Women's Tournament

|-
! colspan="12" style="background:#000; color:#a0000b;"| NCAA Women's Tournament

Rankings
2015–16 NCAA Division I women's basketball rankings

See also
 2015–16 Georgia Bulldogs basketball team

References

Georgia Lady Bulldogs basketball seasons
Georgia
Georgia
Bulldogs
Bulldogs